Tuzk (also transcribed as Tuzuk) is a Persian word referring to the diary of a king. It may refer to one of the following autobiographies:

Tuzk-e-Taimuri, supposed autobiography of Timur
Tuzk-e-Babri, autobiography of Babur
Tuzk-e-Jahangiri, autobiography of Jahangir

Urdu
Persian words and phrases